The epithet the Handsome may refer to:

 Demetrius the Fair (c. 285 BC–249 BC), King of Cyrene
 Ferdinand I of Portugal (1345–1383), King of Portugal and the Algarve
 Frederick the Fair (c. 1289–1330), King of Germany and Duke of Austria and Styria
 Geoffrey Plantagenet, Count of Anjou (1113–1151), Duke of Normandy
 Philibert II, Duke of Savoy (1480–1504)
 Philip I of Castile (1478–1506), first Habsburg King of Castile
 Radu the Handsome (1435–1475), Prince of Wallachia and younger brother of Vlad Ţepeş (better known as Vlad the Impaler)
 Ara the Handsome, legendary Armenian hero

See also
 List of people known as the Beautiful
 List of people known as the Fair

Lists of people by epithet